Horton Bay may refer to:

Horton Bay, Michigan, United States, a census-designated place
Horton Beach, Wales